This is a list of cheerleaders.

Notable cheerleaders
Listed below are a lot of cheerleaders who have been instrumental within the sport.  Some of these people were college cheerleaders, some all star, some famous people who were once talented in the sport, and some fictional one’s that have been seen on television.  This list lacks many powerful people within the sport.  Please add well-known, dedicated cheerleaders to this list.

Individual

 Paula Abdul, Los Angeles Lakers, Van Nuys High School
 Christina Aguilera, North Allegheny Intermediate High School
 Toni Basil, Las Vegas High School
 Jill Belland, Calgary Stampeders
 Sandra Bullock, Washington-Lee High School
 Hilarie Burton, Park View High School
 George W. Bush, Phillips Academy
 Charisma Carpenter, San Diego Chargers
 Miley Cyrus
 Cameron Diaz, Long Beach Polytechnic High School
 Kirsten Dunst
 Dwight D. Eisenhower
 Shannon Elizabeth
 Jaime Espinal, University of Puerto Rico at Bayamón
 Maddie Gardner, Cheer Extreme Allstars, UNC Chapel Hill
 Jennie Garth, Sunburst Middle School
 Jenilee Harrison, Los Angeles Rams
Teri Hatcher, San Francisco 49ers
Jennifer Hawkins, Newcastle Knights
 Brooke Hogan, Clearwater Central Catholic
Kendall Jenner, Sierra Canyon School 
Kylie Jenner, Sierra Canyon School 
 Arielle Kebbel, Winter Park High School
 Stacy Keibler, Baltimore Ravens
 Megyn Kelly
Camille Kostek, New England Patriots Cheerleaders
 Ali Landry
 Jennifer Lawrence
 Justine Lindsay, Carolina Topcats
 Blake Lively, Burbank High School
 Eva Longoria, Roy Miller High School
 Madonna, Rochester Adams High School #69 
 Steve Martin
 Karen McDougal, River Valley High School
 Mandy Moore, Pop Warner
 Rick Perry, Texas A&M University Yell Leader 
 Kelly Ripa
 Mitt Romney, Cranbrook School
 Franklin D. Roosevelt, Harvard
 Jessica Simpson, Richardson North Junior High School
 Phyllis Smith, actress on The Office (US version), St Louis Cardinals football
 Aaron Spelling, Southern Methodist University
 Laura Vikmanis, Cincinnati BenGals
 Reese Witherspoon, Montgomery Bell Academy
 Renée Zellweger, Katy High School

Squads
Dallas Cowboys Cheerleaders
 Hog's Breath Cafe Broncos Cheer Squad
 The Emeralds
 The Sapphires
 Cronulla Sharks Mermaids
 Gold Coast Hogs Breath Cafe Sirens
 Manly Seabirds
 Melbourne Storm Cheerleaders
 Newcastle Knights Cheerleaders
 North Queensland Cowgirls Spirit
 Parramatta Eels Cheerleaders
 Penrith Panthers Cheersquad
 St George-Illawarra Flames
 The Roosters Girls
 XXXX Angels

Fictional cheerleaders

Individual
 Claire Bennet (Hayden Panettiere) and Jackie Wilcox (Danielle Savre), from Heroes
 Boopsie, from the comic strip Doonesbury
 Grace Bowman (Megan Park) from the television series The Secret Life of the American Teenager
 Cordelia Chase (Charisma Carpenter) from Buffy the Vampire Slayer
 Quinn Fabray (Dianna Agron), Santana Lopez (Naya Rivera), Brittany Pierce (Heather Morris), Kitty Wilde (Becca Tobin), Madison McCarthy (Laura Dreyfuss). and Mason McCarthy (Billy Lewis Jr.); Kurt Hummel (Chris Colfer), Mercedes Jones (Amber Riley), Tina Cohen-Chang (Jenna Ushkowitz), and Blaine Anderson (Darren Criss) momentarily, from the musical television series Glee
 Melanie and Martina Grant, from the television game show Fun House
 Elena Gilbert (Nina Dobrev), Caroline Forbes (Candice King) and Bonnie Bennett (Kat Graham), from the CW television series The Vampire Diaries
 Rachel Green (Jennifer Aniston), from the NBC television series Friends
 Sandy Olsson (Olivia Newton-John) and Patty Simcox (Susan Buckner) from the 1978 film Grease
 Bailey Pickett (Debby Ryan) from the television series The Suite Life on Deck
 Kim Possible from the animated Disney Channel series of the same name.
 Alex Russo (Selena Gomez) from the television series Wizards of Waverly Place
 Juliet Starling (voiced by Tara Strong), protagonist of Lollipop Chainsaw
 Snoopy from Peanuts
 Buffy Summers (Sarah Michelle Gellar) from the television series Buffy the Vampire Slayer
 Haruhi Suzumiya, the title character of the Haruhi Suzumiya series is frequently shown in a cheerleader uniform.
 Brittany Taylor, from the MTV animated television series Daria
 Kayla Thomas, from Power Rangers Galactic Force.
 Lilly Truscott (Emily Osment),  from the television series Hannah Montana
 Jessica Wakefield (Brittany Daniel), from the 1990s television series Sweet Valley High
 Lynda Van Der Klok (Kristina Klebe), from the 2007 film Halloween (in the earlier version of the film, she was not a cheerleader)
 Ariana Grande, Daniella Monet, Colleen Ballinger, Tayla Parx, Victoria Monét, and others in the music video for Grande's "thank u, next"

Squads
 Arborville High Hawkettes, including Meg Penny (Shawnee Smith) from the film The Blob (1988)
 Bayside High Tigerettes, from the television series Saved By The Bell, including: Kelly Kapowski (Tiffani Thiessen), Jessie Spano (Elizabeth Berkley), and Lisa Turtle (Lark Vorhees)
 California State College Cheerleaders, from Bring It On Again
 Central High Centaurettes, including Krista Wilson (Sarah Chalke), from the Moment of Truth movie Stand Against Fear
 Cheevers High School Chipmunks, including  London Tipton (Brenda Song), Cody Martin (Cole Sprouse), Nia Moseby (Giovonnie Samuels), Jessica and Janice Ellis (Camilla and Rebecca Rosso), Barbara Brownstein (Sophie Oda), Dana (Daniella Monet), Haley (Tara Lynne Barr), and Leslie (Kaycee Stroh), from "Suite Life of Zack and Cody"
 CHS Cheerleaders from MADtv's High School Musical parody
 Clovis High Cheerleaders, including Justine Essex (Charlotte Ross) and Vicky Gilmore (Kimberly Hooper), from the film She Says She's Innocent (AKA Violation of Trust)
 Crenshaw Heights High Warriors Cheerleaders, including Camille and Jesse, from Bring It On: All or Nothing
 Dancers in Britney Spears' music video for "If U Seek Amy"
 Deering High Tornadoettes, including Amy Wright (real-life former cheerleader Paige Petersen), from Hang Time
 Degrassi Power Cheer, including Becky Baker (Sarah Fisher), Frankie Hollingsworth (Sara Waisglass), Zoë Rivas (Ana Golja), Shay Powers (Reiya Downs), Lola Pacini (Amanda Arcuri), and Jack Jones (Niamh Wilson), from Degrassi
 Degrassi Power Squad, including Paige Michalchuk (Lauren Collins), Hazel Aden (Andrea Lewis), Manny Santos (Cassie Steele), Darcy Edwards (Shenae Grimes), Chantay Black (Jajube Mandiela), Mia Jones (Nina Dobrev), Holly J. Sinclair (Charlotte Arnold), Anya MacPherson (Samantha Munro), Jenna Middleton (Jessica Tyler), Marisol Lewis (Shanice Banton), and Frankie Hollingsworth (Sara Waisglass), from Degrassi: The Next Generation
 Dillon High Pantherettes, including Lyla Garrity (Minka Kelly), from the television series Friday Night Lights
 East Compton High Clovers, including Isis (Gabrielle Union), from Bring It On
 East Lake High School Cheerleaders Craig and Ariana, played by Will Ferrell and Cheri Oteri, on Saturday Night Live 
 Eastland Heights High Highlanderettes, including Danielle, from The New Guy
 East High  Wildcat Cheerleaders from the films High School Musical, High School Musical 2 and High School Musical 3: Senior Year
 Albert Einstein High Cheerleaders, from the novel The Princess Diaries
 Gary Oak's cheer squad from the anime Pokémon
 Grove Lionettes, including Lana Thomas (real-life former cheerleader Mandy Moore), from the film The Princess Diaries
 Hemery High Cheerleaders, including Buffy Summers, from the film Buffy the Vampire Slayer
 Illyria Academy Cheerleaders from the 2006 film She's the Man
 John Hughes High Waspettes, including Priscilla (Jaime Pressly), from Not Another Teen Movie
 Leawood A-Squad, including Dominique Irwin and Leawood B-Squad, including Erin & Michelle Healy and Stacie Cooper.
 Lancer University Hellcats, from the television series Hellcats
 Lincoln High Emancipators ("the Fighting E's") Cheerleaders or the Betty Gang, from the 2001 film Sugar & Spice, including: Diane "the Mastermind" Weston (Marley Shelton), Lucy "the Brain" Whitman, Kansas "the Rebel" Hill (Mena Suvari), Cleo "the Stalker" Miller, Fern "the Terminator" Rogers, Hanna "the Virgin" Wold (Rachel Blanchard), and Lisa "the Informant" Janusch
 Middleton High Mad Dogs Cheerleaders, including Kim Possible and Bonnie Rockwaller
 North Valley Fighting Frogs, including Shelby (Julie Gonzalo), from A Cinderella Story
 The team of cheerleaders in Osu! Tatakae! Ouendan. The sequel has another group of cheerleaders.
 Pacific Vista High Pirates Cheerleaders, including Britney Allen (Hayden Panettiere), from Bring It On: All or Nothing
 Polk High "Polk Dots", including Kelly Bundy (Christina Applegate), from the television series Married... with Children
 Rancho Carne High Toros Cheerleaders, from the film Bring It On, including: Torrance Shipman (real-life former cheerleader Kirsten Dunst), Missy Pantone (Eliza Dushku), Courtney Egbert (real-life former cheerleader Clare Kramer), Whitney (Nicole Bilderback), Darcy (Tsianina Joelson), Big Red (Lindsay Sloane), Kasey (Rini Bell) and Carver (Bianca Kajlich); and their "cheer-boys", Les (Huntley Ritter), Jan (Nathan West) and Aaron (Richard Hillman)
 Riverdale Vixens, including Cheryl Blossom (Madelaine Petsch) from the television series Riverdale.
 Rocky Creek High Drillerettes, from The New Guy
 Silver Hills High Cheer Squad from the Teens of Silver Hills franchise.
 Silverado West Middle School Bulldogs Cheerleaders including Bella Dawson, Sophie Delarosa, and Pepper Silverstein  from the television series Bella and the Bulldogs
 Smallville Crows from Smallville
 Spartanettes, including Jane Burnham (Thora Birch) and Angela Hayes (Mena Suvari), from the 1999 film American Beauty
 Spirit Squad, a tag team in World Wrestling Entertainment
 The Star Squad in Lucky Star
 Sunnydale High Razorbacks Cheerleaders, including Buffy Summers and Cordelia Chase, from the television series Buffy the Vampire Slayer
 SVH Gladiatorettes, including Jessica Wakefield, Sandra Bacon, Melissa Fox, Tia Ramirez, Cherie Reese, Maria Santelli, Jeannie West, Annie Whitman, Robin Wilson, and Jade Wu, from Sweet Valley High
 Tree Hill High Ravenettes, including Brooke Davis, Rachel Gatina, Peyton Sawyer, Haley James Scott and Bevin, from the television series One Tree Hill
 Union Wells High Wildcats Cheerleaders, including Claire Bennet (Hayden Panettiere) and Jackie Wilcox, from Heroes
 Warrior and Mighty Duck Cheerleaders from D3: The Mighty Ducks
 William McKinley High School Cheerios, including Quinn Fabray (Dianna Agron), from Glee
 Christy, Ping, McKenzie and other cheerleaders from Groove Squad
 Breakers, all-men university cheerleaders squad from Japanese novel Cheer Boys!! by Ryō Asai. The novel was later adapted as manga and anime.

References

 
Cheerleaders
Cheerleaders